Henry Fenwick (1820 – 16 April 1868) was a British Liberal Party politician.

He first stood for election to the House of Commons in December 1852, when he was unsuccessful at a by-election for the City of Durham. He was elected as a member of parliament (MP) for Sunderland at a by-election in January 1855, and held the seat until February 1866, when he was appointed as Civil Lord of the Admiralty and was defeated in the resulting by-election.

References

External links 
 

1820 births
1868 deaths
Liberal Party (UK) MPs for English constituencies
UK MPs 1852–1857
UK MPs 1857–1859
UK MPs 1859–1865
UK MPs 1865–1868
Lords of the Admiralty